Johannes Christensen (14 February 1889 – 23 April 1957) was a Danish long-distance runner. He competed in the marathon at the 1912 Summer Olympics.

References

External links
 

1889 births
1957 deaths
Athletes (track and field) at the 1912 Summer Olympics
Danish male long-distance runners
Danish male marathon runners
Olympic athletes of Denmark
Sportspeople from Frederiksberg